Giuseppe Motta Medal is presented annually since 2004 by the Geneva Institute for Democracy and Development to the people from any country or region of the world for exceptional achievement in the promotion of peace and democracy, human rights and sustainable development. The prize commemorates Giuseppe Motta (1871–1940), a Swiss politician, five-time President of the Swiss Confederation, President of the League of Nations Assembly and member of the Swiss Federal Council.

Three medals are awarded annually according to nominations:
 Support for peace and democracy
 Protection of human rights
 Work to achieve sustainable development

Medal winners

References

External links
 Official Website
 The Geneva Institute for Democracy and Development

Human rights awards
European awards
Peace awards